Jan-Hendrik Marx (born 26 April 1995) is a German professional footballer who plays as a right-back for Eintracht Braunschweig.

Career
Marx made his professional debut for Waldhof Mannheim in the 3. Liga on 21 July 2019, starting in the away match against Chemnitzer FC which finished as a 1–1 draw.

On 30 December 2021, Marx agreed to join Eintracht Braunschweig until 30 June 2023.

References

External links
 
 

1995 births
Living people
People from Main-Taunus-Kreis
Sportspeople from Darmstadt (region)
Footballers from Hesse
German footballers
Association football fullbacks
Kickers Offenbach players
SV Waldhof Mannheim players
FC Ingolstadt 04 players
Eintracht Braunschweig players
2. Bundesliga players
3. Liga players
Regionalliga players